The Cornell Big Red represent Cornell University in ECAC women's ice hockey during the 2017–18 NCAA Division I women's ice hockey season.

In the offseason, Cornell hired Dean Jackson as an assistant coach, who had led nearby Elmira College to a Division III National Championship in 2013, and had most recently been interim head coach for Penn State.

Canadian Cornell skaters were well represented in international play over the spring and summer.  During the IIHF World Championships in Plymouth, Michigan, four Big Red alumni, Laura Fortino (2013), Lauriane Rougeau (2013), Brianne Jenner (2015) and Rebecca Johnston (2012), skated for the silver-medal Canadians. In May, Team Canada named 28 players to the Centralization Roster, including 5 alumni, Fortino, Rogeau, Jenner, Johnston, and Jillian Saulnier (2015), and one current player, Micah Hart.  23 of the 28 will be named to the roster for the 2018 Olympics.

Following a 2017 NCAA Tournament appearance, the Big Red began the season ranked seventh in both national polls.

Recruiting

2017–18 Big Red

Standings

2017–18 Schedule

|-
!colspan=12 style=""| Regular Season

Awards and honors
 Kristin O'Neill, Ivy League PLAYER OF THE YEAR
 Maddie Mills, Ivy League ROOKIE OF THE YEAR
 Doug Derraugh, Ivy League COACH OF THE YEAR
 Kristin O'Neill, First Team All-Ivy
 Maddie Mills, First Team All-Ivy
 Jaime Bourbonnais, First Team All-Ivy
 Marlène Boissonnault, First Team All-Ivy
 Lenka Serdar, Honorable Mention All-Ivy

References

Cornell
Cornell Big Red women's ice hockey seasons
Cornell
Cornell